Eli Sjursdotter is a 1938 Norwegian drama film directed by Arne Bornebusch and Leif Sinding, starring Sonja Wigert, Ingjald Haaland and Sten Lindgren. The film is based on Johan Falkberget's 1913 novel of the same name.

In 1719, during the Great Northern War, a Swedish army is making its way home through Trøndelag during a particularly cold winter. The Swedish soldier Per Jönsa (Lindgren) seeks refuge in a mountain cottage, where he is cared for by the peasant daughter Eli Sjursdotter (Wigert). This is not well received by Eli's father (Haaland), who hates the Swedes.

External links

1938 films
1938 drama films
Films directed by Leif Sinding
Films directed by Arne Bornebusch
Norwegian black-and-white films
Norwegian drama films
1930s Norwegian-language films